The men's volleyball tournament at the 2021 Southeast Asian Games is currently held at the Đại Yên Arena in Quảng Ninh from 13 May to 22 May 2022.

Draw
The draw for the men's volleyball tournament was held on 8 April 2022 in Hanoi. Vietnam as host chose the group which it wanted to be allocated in.

Venue

Participating nations

Squads

Results

Preliminary round
All times are Vietnam Standard Time (UTC+07:00)
Group A

|}

|}

Group B

|}

|}

Final round
All times are Vietnam Standard Time (UTC+07:00)

5th–7th place play-off

|}

Semifinals

|}

Fifth place match

|}

Bronze medal match

|}

Gold medal match

|}

Final standings

See also
Women's tournament

References

External links

Men's tournament
Southeast Asian Games